Sakata may refer to:

People 
 Jeanne Sakata, American actress and playwright
 Lenn Sakata (Lenn Haruki Sakata) (born 1954), former American professional baseball player
 Harold Sakata (Toshiyuki "Harold" Sakata) (1920–1982), American Olympic medalist and professional wrestler
 Sakata Eio (1920–2010), Japanese professional Go player
 Sakata Minoru (1902–1974), Japanese photographer
 Sakata no Kintoki, the Japanese folk hero Kintarō
 Sakata Tōjūrō, stage name taken on by a number of Kabuki actors
 Takefumi Sakata (born 1980), Japanese flyweight boxer
 Shoichi Sakata (Sakata Shōichi) (1911–1970), Japanese physicist
 Akira Sakata (born 1945), Japanese saxophonist

Places 
 Sakata, Yamagata, a city in Yamagata Prefecture, Japan
 Sakata District, Shiga, a district located in Shiga, Japan
 Sakata people, a tribe in the Black Water Province of the Democratic Republic of the Congo

Other 
 Sakata language, a language in the Black Water Province of the Democratic Republic of the Congo

Japanese-language surnames